Henryk Ross (1 May 1910  1991) was a Polish Jewish photographer who was employed by the Department of Statistics for the Jewish Council within the Łódź Ghetto during the Holocaust in occupied Poland.

About 
Ross was born in 1910. Ross was a sports photographer for a Warsaw newspaper, prior to World War II.

Starting in 1940, Ross had been employed by the Department of Statistics for the Jewish Council within the Łódź Ghetto during the Holocaust in occupied Poland. Daringly, working as staff photographer, Ross also documented Nazi atrocities (such as public hangings) while remaining officially in the good graces of the German occupational administration.

Part of his official duties was taking identity photographs. He constructed a three level stage in his studio that let him photograph up to twelve people with a single negative. While the authorities only supplied him enough film for assigned work, this trick allowed him extra film he could use for unauthorized photography.

His unofficial images covered scenes from daily life, communal celebrations, children digging for scraps of food and large groups of Jews being led to deportation and being loaded into box cars. As the ghetto was being liquidated in the fall of 1944, Ross buried his photos and negatives in a box, hoping they might survive as a historical record. He was able to dig up the box in January 1945, after the Red Army liberated Poland. Much of his material was damaged or destroyed by water; still, about half of his 6,000 images survived.  

Ross later testified during the 1961 trial of Adolf Eichmann.

Legacy 
In 2021, a gift of 48 of Ross's silver gelatin prints were given to the Museum of Fine Arts, Boston (MFA), which makes it one of the few US museums to own work by Ross.

References

 
 

Photographers from Warsaw
1910 births
1991 deaths
Łódź Ghetto inmates
Holocaust photographers
Adolf Eichmann